Donnersdorf is a municipality in the district of Schweinfurt in Bavaria, Germany.

Notable people

Born at Donnersdorf

 Andreas Halbig (1807-1869), German sculptor
 Johann Halbig (1814-1882), German sculptor

Others
 Gerhard Eck (* 1960), State Secretary in the Bavarian State Ministry of the Interior and mayor of Donnersdorf from 1990 to 2009
 Bernhard Grzimek (1909-1987), pioneer of the world nature conservation, had his retirement age in the middle mill near Donnersdorf

References

Schweinfurt (district)